William M. Beasley (born March 19, 1940) is an American politician from the state of Alabama. He is a Democratic member of the Alabama Senate, representing the 28th district.

Beasley graduated from Auburn University in 1962. He was elected to the Alabama House of Representatives in 1998. After being consistently reelected, Beasley ran for the State Senate in 2010, and defeated fellow Democrat Johnny Ford. He succeeded Myron Penn, who did not seek reelection. He considered running for Governor of Alabama in the 2014 election.

Beasley is from Clayton, Alabama. His older brother is former Lieutenant Governor of Alabama Jere Beasley.

See also
List of Auburn University people

References

External links
 
 Biography at Ballotpedia

1940 births
21st-century American politicians
Democratic Party Alabama state senators
Auburn University alumni
Living people
Democratic Party members of the Alabama House of Representatives
People from Clayton, Alabama